Georges Fontès (5 September 1924 – 3 March 2020) was a French politician. He was first a member of the Social Democratic Party (PSD), then the Rally for the Republic (RPR), and finally the Union for a Popular Movement (UMP).

Biography
Fontès was the son of a truck driver and a housekeeper. He was excluded from the Grand Orient de France for "inassuidity". He was in favor of reestablishing the death penalty in France.

Honors
Officer of the Legion of Honour (2011)
Knight of the Ordre national du Mérite

References

1924 births
2020 deaths
People from Béziers
Rally for the Republic politicians
Union for a Popular Movement politicians